Global Cycling Network (GCN) is a cycling-related YouTube channel which was launched in 2013. It is run by the multi-channel network Play Sports Network, a subsidiary of Warner Bros. Discovery. The channel is presented by Daniel Lloyd, Under-23 British National Mountain Biking champion Simon Richardson, Oliver Bridgewood, Alex Paton, Welsh former track cyclist Manon Lloyd, Conor Dunne,  and James Lowsley-Williams. It is headquartered in Bath, Somerset under its parent company.

History 
On 1 January 2013, Global Cycling Network was launched by SHIFT Active Media founder Simon Wear, under Google's now-defunct YouTube Original Channel Initiative, as part of its multi-channel network media strategy. Wear's original objective was to create a "network of quality cycling video content creators and give cycling global promotion through an official channel". The YouTube channel also provides a media channel for the promotion of the parent company's client brands.

In 2015, the channel was awarded Best Vlogger/Best Use of Video during the Cycling Media Awards 2015 awards night, which aims to recognise the best of UK cycling media. In 2016 the parent company's multi-channel network division was spun off as Play Sports Network, and management of the channel was transferred to the new company. On 18 April 2017 the channel broke the 1 million subscriber mark.

On 27 February 2017, Discovery Communications, the owner of Eurosport, announced the acquisition of a 20% stake in Play Sports Group, the company that owns the GCN channel. In 2019, Discovery Communications acquired a controlling interest in Play Sports Group and the GCN franchise, increasing holdings to 71%.

In February 2018, GCN announced the addition of time trial and duathlon world champion Emma Pooley to the team. On 24 March 2019, Pooley announced that after presenting for a year she would be leaving the channel to concentrate on engineering.

On 3 July 2018, GCN announced another new presenter, cycling journalist and PhD graduate Oliver Bridgewood, who previously worked as a writer and video producer at Cycling Weekly.

On 26 July 2019, GCN introduced Jeremy Powers,  a former professional racing cyclist who has won over 90 UCI victories, four USA Cyclocross National Championships, the 2015 Pan-American UCI cyclocross championships, and the most cyclocross races by any American male.

On 24 December 2019, GCN announced the addition of former Welsh track cyclist 2016 UEC European Track Championships team pursuit bronze medallist Manon Lloyd as a presenter.

On 29 October 2020, GCN announced the addition of Alex Paton as a presenter on their GCN Tech channel.

Content 
Global Cycling Network's content tends to be predominantly road cycling-related, with regular sections consisting of instructional videos, including videos on bicycle riding, maintenance and tech news, how-to videos, and a weekly news bulletin, "The GCN Show". The channel also features interviews of professional cyclists and coverage of international professional cycling events, including the Tour of Beijing, Dubai Tour, and the three Grand Tour races (the Tour de France, Giro d'Italia and Vuelta a España). Occasionally, the channel also creates videos on cyclo-cross and less frequently, mountain biking (mostly covered on Global Cycling Network's sister channel, Global Mountain Bike Network).

The channel also produces a "Road Bike Party" series of videos featuring former trials rider Martyn Ashton performing stunts on road bikes. It was a continuation of Ashton's independently-created first video, Road Bike Party 1. As of April 2017, Road Bike Party 2 had received more than 15 million views.

In 2014, British Cycling partnered with Global Cycling Network in the creation of its Racesmart campaign, which aimed to promote safe cycle racing in Great Britain.

Presenters

Global Cycling Network 
 Simon Richardson
 Dan Lloyd
 James Lowsley-Williams (aka Hank)
 Oliver Bridgewood
 Conor Dunne
 Manon Lloyd
 Alex Paton

GCN en Español (Spanish-language, since 2018) 
 Lucas Sebastian Haedo
 Bernat Font

GCN en français (French-language) 
 Florian Chabbal
 Loic Chetout

GCN Italia (Italian-language, since 2019) 
 Alan Marangoni
 Giorgio Brambilla

GCN Japan (Japanese-language, since 2019) 
 Yukihiro Doi

GCN auf Deutsch (German-language, since 2020) 
Richard Weinzheimer
Tobias Knaup

Former presenters 
 Matt Stephens, one of the original GCN presenters, 1998 British National Road Race Champion and 1992 Olympian (Road Race). Stephens served as a GCN presenter for four and a half years before leaving the programme to focus on live race commentary for Eurosport.
 Emma Pooley
 Chris Opie. Chris left GCN to focus on returning to professional racing
 Katherine Moore
 Jeremy Powers
 Mayalen Noriega
 Oscar Pujol
 Mario Vogt
 Björn Thurau
 Jon Cannings

References

External links 
 
 

YouTube channels launched in 2013
Cycling websites